Henry Alan Morgan (born 5 June 1938) is a former New Zealand cricketer who played first-class cricket for Wellington from 1963 to 1978.

Harry Morgan was a medium-pace bowler and useful lower-order batsman who was an irregular member of the Wellington team for 15 years. His best first-class bowling figures were 5 for 42 against Canterbury in 1966-67. His highest score was 67, also against Canterbury, in his second-last match in 1977-78.

He won the Man of the Match award in the final of the New Zealand Motor Corporation Knock-Out in 1973-74. He took 3 for 55 in Auckland’s innings then top-scored with 46 as Wellington reached their target with one wicket and six balls to spare.

His son Richard played first-class cricket in New Zealand from 1993 to 2002.

References

External links
 
 

1938 births
Living people
New Zealand cricketers
Wellington cricketers
Cricketers from Wellington City